Land o' Lakes is a census-designated place (CDP) in Pasco County, Florida, United States. Land o' Lakes is part of the Tampa-St. Petersburg-Clearwater, Florida MSA.

As of the 2010 census, the CDP population was 31,145. The CDP grew rapidly during the 1990s, growing from 7,800 residents to 20,971 as new housing developments were built. Average annual income is higher than the rest of Florida. The CDP had a population in 2007 of 30,400 residents. The name Land o' Lakes was suggested at a community meeting in 1949. On September 1, 1950, the Ehren post office was renamed Land o' Lakes.

Dupree Gardens, one of Florida's original roadside tourist attractions, was located at Land o' Lakes (although the name Land o' Lakes was not yet in use).

Description
Land o' Lakes has been growing very rapidly in the past 10 to 20 years. Nearby former towns have been absorbed into Land o' Lakes such as Denham, Ehren, and Gowers Corner. New neighborhoods, shopping, and schools have been built.  It is also a member of the Pasco County Library Cooperative with a library branch, the Land o' Lakes Branch Library, at 2818 Collier Parkway, Land o' Lakes, Florida 34639.

Demographics

As of the census of 2010, there were 31,145 people, 11,230 households, and 8,286 families residing in the CDP. The racial makeup of the CDP was 86.9% White, 6.2% African American, 0.1% Native American, 3.4% Asian, 2.0% from other races, and 1.4% from two or more races. Hispanic or Latino of any race were 11.7% of the population. The subdivision of Carpenter's Run was used for filming the 1990 film Edward Scissorhands.

There were 11,230 households, out of which 37.4% had children under the age of 18 living with them, 62.5% were married couples living together, 6.3% had a female householder with no husband present, and 26.2% were non-families. 16.3% of all households were made up of individuals, and 5.1% had someone living alone who was 65 years of age or older.  The average household size was 2.75 and the average family size was 3.20.

In the CDP, the population was spread out, with 24.7% under the age of 18, 5.7% from 18 to 24, 32.1% from 25 to 44, 25.0% from 45 to 64, and 11.4% who were 65 years of age or older. The median age was 37.7 years. For every 100 females, there were 98.3 males.  For every 100 women age 18 and over, there were 95.3 men.

The median income for a household in the CDP was $72,500, and the median income for a family was $81,218. Males had a median income of $48,251 versus $37,753 for females. The per capita income for the CDP was $23,230.  About 3.4% of families and 4.9% of the population were below the poverty line, including 5.1% of those under age 18 and 4.0% of those age 65 or over.

Major roads

  Suncoast Parkway runs north and south along the western edge of Land o' Lakes (actually closer to Odessa).
  U.S. Route 41 (Land o' Lakes Boulevard) is the main north-south road in Land o' Lakes as well as the rest of central Pasco County.
  SR 54 is the main east-west road that runs through southern Pasco County, from US 19 near Holiday to US 301 in Zephyrhills.
  SR 597 (Dale Mabry Highway)
  County Road 583 (Ehren Cutoff) runs northeast to southwest from US 41 to SR 52 in rural Pasco County.
 Collier Parkway

Culture
An honorary mayor position was established by area residents in 1968. The honorary mayor has no real political power and only has ceremonial duties.

Education
Public district schools are operated by the Pasco County Schools.

High schools
 Land O Lakes High School
 Sunlake High School

Middle schools
 Pine View Middle School
 Charles S. Rushe Middle School

Elementary schools
 Lake Myrtle Elementary School
 Oakstead Elementary School
 Pine View Elementary School
 Denham Oaks Elementary School
 Connerton Elementary School
 Sanders Memorial Elementary School
 Bexley Elementary School

Charter schools
 Countryside Montessori
 Imagine School at Land O Lakes
 Classical Preparatory School

Private schools
 Academy at the Lakes
 Land O Lakes Christian School
 Center Academy Lutz

Notable companies
 Artix Entertainment

Points of interest
 Conner Preserve
 Cypress Creek Preserve
 Dupree Gardens (Historical marker and gate ruins)

References

External links

 History of Land o' Lakes

 
Census-designated places in Pasco County, Florida
Census-designated places in Florida